Lilian Marguerite Medland (29 May 1880 – 16 December 1955) was an English-born nurse and Australian illustrator of books on birds.  She produced paintings to illustrate Gregory Mathews' books on Australian birds.  She also illustrated the plates for her husband Tom Iredale's books Birds of Paradise and Bower Birds (1950) and Birds of New Guinea (1956).

Biography 

Lilian Marguerite Medland was born on 29 May 1880 in London, England. She trained as a nurse at Guy's Hospital in London. In her late twenties, Medland became almost completely deaf as a result of an attack of diphtheria.

Medland moved to Sydney, Australia in 1923, the same year she married Tom Iredale.

Lilian Medland's mother was Ada Emmeline Cranstone, niece of Lefevre James Cranstone. Ada Emmeline was a pupil at the school run by Lefevre James' wife, Lillia Messenger, in Hemel Hempstead, where Lefevre James taught art.

Career 

In 1925 Medland painted a series bird for the Australian Museum. The series of thirty species of birds was published as postcards.

She illustrated a variety of books and articles, including plates for her husband's books.

Works 

 The Birds Of The British Isles Volumes I – V (London, 1906)
 Birds of Paradise and Bower Birds (Melbourne, 1950)
 Birds of New Guinea (Melbourne, 1956)

References 

 Robin, Libby. (2001). The Flight of the Emu: a hundred years of Australian ornithology 1901-2001. Carlton, Vic. Melbourne University Press. 

1880 births
1955 deaths
20th-century Australian painters
20th-century Australian women artists
Artists from London
Australian bird artists
Australian illustrators
Australian women illustrators